KSMR-LP (97.1 FM) is a radio station licensed to Great Falls, Montana, United States. The station is currently owned by Saint Michael Radio, Inc.

Translators

References

External links
 

Low-power FM radio stations in Montana
SMR-LP
Great Falls, Montana